Juan Pallejá (1889-1971) was a Spanish film editor. As well as editing feature films such as Malvaloca, Pallejá was noted for his work on documentaries.

Selected filmography
 Malvaloca (1942)
 Traces of Light (1943)
 Gentleman Thief (1946)
 The King's Mail (1951)
 The Pelegrín System (1952)
 Persecution in Madrid (1952)
 That Man in Istanbul (1968)

References

Bibliography 
 Crusells, Magi. Directores de cine en Cataluña: de la A a la Z. Edicions Universitat Barcelona, 2009.

External links 
 

1889 births
1971 deaths
Spanish film editors
People from Lleida